There's a Riot Goin' On (sometimes referred to as Riot) is the fifth studio album by American funk and soul band Sly and the Family Stone. It was recorded from 1970 to 1971 at Record Plant Studios in Sausalito, California and released later that year on November 1 by Epic Records. The recording was dominated by band frontman/songwriter Sly Stone during a period of escalated drug use and intra-group tension.

With the album, Sly and the Family Stone departed from the optimistic sound of their previous music and explored a darker, more challenging sound featuring edgy funk rhythms, primitive drum machine, extensive overdubbing, and a dense mix. Conceptually and lyrically, There's a Riot Goin' On embraced apathy, pessimism, and disillusionment with both Stone's fame and 1960s counterculture amid a turbulent political climate in the United States at the turn of the 1970s, influenced by the decline of the civil rights movement and the rise of the Black Power movement. The album's title was originally planned to be Africa Talks to You, but it changed in response to Marvin Gaye's album What's Going On (1971), released six months before Riot.

A commercial success, There's a Riot Goin' On topped the Billboard Pop Album and Soul Album charts, while its lead single "Family Affair" reached number-one on the Pop Singles chart. The album was eventually certified platinum by the Recording Industry Association of America (RIAA) for sales of at least one million copies in the US. Originally released to mixed reviews, the album has since been praised as one of the greatest and most influential recordings of all time, having impacted the funk, jazz-funk, and hip hop genres in particular. It ranks frequently and highly in many publications' best-album lists, including Rolling Stones "500 Greatest Albums of All Time", on which it placed 99th in 2003 and 82nd in 2020.

Background
Having achieved great success with their 1969 album Stand! and performance at Woodstock, Sly & the Family Stone were due to have submitted an album of new recordings to Epic Records by 1970. However, Sly Stone missed several recording deadlines, worrying CBS executive Clive Davis, and a Greatest Hits album was released in an eighteen-month stretch during which the band released no new material, except for the single "Thank You (Falettinme Be Mice Elf Agin)". Relationships within the band were deteriorating, with friction between the Stone brothers and bassist Larry Graham.

Epic executives requested more product from the band, and the Black Panther Party, with which Stone had become associated, was demanding he make his music more militant and reflective of the black power movement, that he replace drummer Greg Errico and saxophonist Jerry Martini with black instrumentalists, and replace manager David Kapralik. After moving to Los Angeles, California in late 1969 Stone and his bandmates began to use cocaine and PCP heavily rather than recording music. During this time Sly & the Family Stone released only one single, "Thank You (Falettinme Be Mice Elf Agin)" / "Everybody Is a Star", issued in December 1969. Although "Star" was a positive song in the vein of their previous hit "Everyday People" (1968), "Thank You" featured a darker political theme.

By 1970, Stone had become erratic and moody, missing nearly a third of the band's concert dates. He hired streetwise friends Hamp "Bubba" Banks and J.B. Brown as his personal managers, and they enlisted gangsters Edward "Eddie Chin" Elliott and Mafioso J.R. Valtrano as his bodyguards. Stone assigned these individuals to handle his business dealings, find drugs and protect him from those he considered enemies, among them his own bandmates and staff. A rift developed between Sly and the rest of the band, which led to drummer Gregg Errico's departure in early 1971. Speculation arose as to the release of new studio material. In a December 24, 1970 article for Rolling Stone magazine, journalist Jon Landau wrote:

Stone's intention of a darker, more conceptual work was influenced by drug use and the events that writer Miles Marshall Lewis called "the death of the sixties"; political assassinations, police brutality, the decline of the civil rights movement and social disillusionment. According to The Austin Chronicle, "slowed down, [Sly's] quest for post-stardom identity mirrored black America's quest for post-Sixties purpose."

Recording and production

Sly Stone mostly worked on There's a Riot Goin' On alone in a studio that he had built for himself at The Plant Studios, also known as The Record Plant, in Sausalito, California, or at his home studio in the loft of his Bel Air mansion. He would often lie down in the bed and record his vocals with a wireless microphone system. According to the other Family Stone members, most of the album was performed by him alone, overdubbing and sometimes using a drum machine to lay down beats, namely the Maestro Rhythm King MRK-2, which featured preset rhythms. Stone felt that the rhythm box made unrealistic sounds if used as designed, so he resorted to overdubbing the drum sounds manually, contributing to the dense mix.

Other band members contributed by overdubbing alone with Sly instead of playing together as before. For "Family Affair" and some other tracks Stone enlisted several other musicians including Billy Preston, Ike Turner, and Bobby Womack instead of his bandmates, and several female vocalists mostly omitted from the final mix. The album's muddy, gritty sound was due in part to this overdubbing and erasing and mixing techniques nearly drowned out undubbed sounds. Miles Marshall Lewis stated, "Never before on a Sly and the Family Stone album were songs open to so much interpretation, and even more so, dripping with cynicism. On the other hand you can hardly hear what he's saying for most of the album. Like Radiohead's Kid A (2000) or even the Rolling Stones' Exile on Main St. (1972) more recent to the time, a murkiness in the mix of the record inhibits complete comprehension of the words."

In the fall of 1971 Stone delivered the final mixes to the CBS Records offices, relieving the worried Davis. CBS issued "Family Affair" as the first single, the band's first in nearly two years. A somber, electric piano-based record sung by Sly (in a low, relaxed tone) and sister Rose Stone, it became their fourth and final number-one pop hit. It is one of the earliest hit recordings to use a drum machine – a slightly earlier Sly Stone production, Little Sister's "Somebody's Watching You", was also among the first.

Music and lyrics

The album departs from the optimistic psychedelic soul sound of the group's 1960s records, instead embracing a darker sound featuring filtered drum-machine tracks. Songs such as "Luv 'n Haight", "Thank You for Talking to Me Africa", and "Spaced Cowboy" are characterized by edgier, unrelenting grooves with rhythmic sounds resembling murmuring noises. Conceptually, Riot embraces apathy as a source for deriving rhythmic and emotional energy, departing from the more welcoming sentiments of songs like "Dance to the Music" (1968). As The New York Times writer Jon Pareles explains, it was "about turning away from the post-1960s turbulence of the Nixon presidency and withdrawing into music as a hazy refuge", exemplified in the opening track "Luv n' Haight" and its declaration of "Feel so good inside myself, don't want to move".

"Luv n' Haight" is satirically titled as a reference to the Haight-Ashbury scene, while the music and lyrics express disillusionment with the 1960s counterculture. BBC Musics Stevie Chick cites the track, with its "desperate call-and-response set to fiercely combative lick", as an example of Riots "dark" and "troubled" funk. "Africa Talks to You" is a nine-minute funk jam written in response to the backlash Sly Stone received from estranged fans and friends, record industry associates, and the media. According to biographer Eddie Santiago, the lyrics cynically portray "fame and its cold retrogression into perceived insanity", with a chorus that reflects "Sly's feelings on being cut down in his prime like a tree in the forest."

The album's title track is silent and listed as zero minutes and zero seconds long. For many years it was speculated that this cryptic track listing and the title of the album referred to a July 27, 1970, riot in Chicago for which Sly & the Family Stone had been blamed. The band was to play a free show in Grant Park but the crowd became restless before the band began and started rioting. Over a hundred people were injured, including several police officers, and the reason given to the press was that the band was late and/or refused to perform. The original LP jacket featured a photo collage with a picture of the band-shell in Grant Park overlaid with a photo of a police car. However, in 1997 Sly Stone said that the "There's a Riot Goin' On" track had no running time simply because "I felt there should be no riots."

The closing track "Thank You for Talking to Me Africa" is a slow reworking of Sly and the Family Stone's 1969 "Thank You" single. The result is described by AllMusic's Matthew Greenwald as a blues- and gospel-influenced examination of urban tension and the end of the 1960s. He goes on to say it is "perhaps the most frightening recording from the dawn of the 1970s, capturing all of the drama, ennui, and hedonism of the decade to come with almost a clairvoyant feel."

Artwork
The original cover art for Riot featured a red, white, and black American flag with suns in place of the stars. No other text or titles appear on the cover, although Epic executives added a "Featuring the Hit Single 'Family Affair'" sticker to the LP for commercial viability and identification purposes. Family Stone A&R director Steve Paley took the photograph. Three of the custom flags were created: one for Sly, one for Epic Records, and one for Paley.

In an interview with Jonathan Dakss, Stone explained the album cover's concept, stating "I wanted the flag to truly represent people of all colors. I wanted the color black because it is the absence of color. I wanted the color white because it is the combination of all colors. And I wanted the color red because it represents the one thing that all people have in common: blood. I wanted suns instead of stars because stars to me imply searching, like you search for your star. And there are already too many stars in this world. But the sun, that's something that is always there, looking right at you. Betsy Ross did the best she could with what she had. I thought I could do better."

The outer album sleeve features a photo collage, by artist Lynn Ames, depicting American cultural images of the early 1970s. Featured on this collage were color photos and black & whites of the Family Stone, the Capitol, a grinning boy in plaid pants, the American flag with a peace sign in place of the stars, the Marina City twin towers of Chicago, a Department of Public Works caution sign, a piece of the Gettysburg Address, the tail end of a gas guzzler, drummer Buddy Miles, the Lincoln Memorial, soul musician Bobby Womack, a bulldog, several anonymous smiling faces, and Sly's pit bull, Gun.

Reception and legacy

There's a Riot Goin' On was met with a divided response from professional critics and general listeners, who found its production and lyrical content particularly challenging. Reviewing in November 1971 for the Los Angeles Times, Robert Hilburn disapproved of the Family Stone's stylistic change from  "soulflavored" songs such as "Everyday People" and "Hot Fun in the Summertime", while saying that "there is little on the album that is worth your attention". Fellow critic Greil Marcus called the record "Muzak with its finger on the trigger." Others were more overt in their praise. Rolling Stone reviewer Vince Aletti wrote that, "At first I hated it for its weakness and its lack of energy and I still dislike these qualities. But then I began to respect the album's honesty". Aletti cited it as "one of the most important fucking albums this year" and "the new urban music... not about dancing to the music, in the streets. It's about disintegration, getting fucked up, nodding, maybe dying. There are flashes of euphoria, ironic laughter, even some bright stretches but mostly it's just junkie death, oddly unoppressive and almost attractive in its effortlessness".  A columnist for Hit Parader magazine gave Riot a favorable review, and stated that the album has "a lot that makes Sly the in-person rave that he is." In The Village Voice, Robert Christgau concluded that "what's expressed is the bitterest ghetto pessimism", backed by "subtle production techniques and jarring song compositions", while declaring Riot to be "one of those rare albums whose whole actually does exceed the sum of its parts".

There's a Riot Goin' On was included on several music publications' "End of the Year" lists and critics' polls, including The Village Voices Pazz & Jop albums list at number seven. The album achieved commercial success with two hit singles and reaching number-one on the Billboard Pop Albums and Soul Albums chart. It later came to be viewed by critics as one of the greatest and most influential albums. Christgau wrote in 2007 that the "temptations and contradictions" of commercial stardom consumed Sly Stone and resulted in "the prophetic 1971" album, "its taped-over murk presaging Exile on Main St., its drum-machine beats throwing knuckleballs at [Miles Davis] and [James Brown], it was darker than the Velvet Underground and Nico and funkier than shit, yet somehow it produced two smash hits, including the stark, deep 'Family Affair'." AllMusic described the album as "funk at its deepest and most impenetrable," stating that "what makes Riot so remarkable is that it's hard not to get drawn in with him, as you're seduced by the narcotic grooves, seductive vocals slurs, leering electric pianos, and crawling guitars." Zeth Lundy of PopMatters deemed it "a challenging listen, at times rambling, incoherent, dissonant, and just plain uncomfortable" with "some episodic moments of pop greatness to be found". Lundy went on to discuss its radical departure from the band's past music:

There's a Riot Goin' On has been considered one of the first instances of the funk music later popularized by George Clinton and Funkadelic, the Ohio Players, and similar acts. The album, as well as the follow-ups Fresh and Small Talk, are considered among the first and best examples of the matured version of funk music, after prototypical instances of the sound in Sly & the Family Stone's 1960s work. Riots sound also helped inspire Miles Davis and Herbie Hancock to crossover to jazz-funk. It was called "a masterpiece of darkly psychedelic funk" by AllMusic contributor Steve Huey, and "a phenomenal, dirty, psychedelic funk album" by Drowned in Sound journalist Jon Falcone, who said it soundtracked the political and social turbulence that opened the 1970s. Paul Grimstad from Brooklyn Rail regarded it as a "frigid yet weirdly intimate" avant-pop record.

In 1994 There's a Riot Going On was ranked number 14 in Colin Larkin's Top 50 Soul Albums. Larkin described the album as "unlike anything heard before in black music". A 2003 article for Rolling Stone commented; "Sly and the Family Stone created a musical utopia: an interracial group of men and women who blended funk, rock and positive vibes... Sly Stone ultimately discovered that his utopia had a ghetto, and he brilliantly tore the whole thing down on There's a Riot Goin' On, which does not refute the joy of his earlier music." In addition to being featured near the top of several major publications' "best album" lists, Riot was also ranked at number 99 on Rolling Stones 2003 list of the 500 Greatest Albums of All Time, maintaining the rating in a 2012 revised list, one of four Sly & the Family Stone entries to be included on the list; it is the second highest of the band's entries, preceded by Greatest Hits (#60), and followed by Stand! (#118) and Fresh (#186). In the 2020 updated list, the album was raised to number 82 and became the highest ranked of the three Sly & The Family Stone entries, ahead of Stand! (#119) & Greatest Hits (#343). Pitchfork named it the fourth best album of the 1970s.

Riots songs have been extensively covered and sampled. Artists who have covered or reworked its songs include Iggy Pop, John Legend, Lalah Hathaway, Ultramagnetic MC's, De La Soul, Beastie Boys and Gwen Guthrie. Dave Rosen of Ink Blot magazine said that the album sounds unique, ironically in view of its vast influence; "Sly employed the unconventional (and possibly entirely original) technique of mixing live drums with what was at the time a primitive drum machine ... The introspective, yet political lyrics, the hard and dirty funk grooves, the inspirational, yet depressing songs—all of these elements would come to influence not only peers like Marvin Gaye and James Brown, but two generations of rappers and funkateers who paid homage to Sly's vision by making his samples and beats an essential backbone of their own innovations. Sly's Riot is still goin' on." In a book on the album for the 33⅓ series, Miles Marshall Lewis described it as "one of the most powerful and haunting albums to inspire the hip hop movement." The singer Bilal names it among his 25 favorite albums, appreciating the drum machine sounds in particular.

Track listing
All tracks written, produced and arranged by Sylvester "Sly Stone" Stewart for Stone Flower Productions.

 Sides one and two were combined as tracks 1–12 on CD reissues.

Personnel

Musicians

Sly Stone – arrangements, drums, drum programming, keyboard programming, synthesizers, guitar, bass, keyboards, vocals
Rose Stone – vocals, keyboards
Billy Preston – keyboards
Jerry Martini – tenor saxophone
Cynthia Robinson – trumpet
Freddie Stone – guitar
Ike Turner – guitar
Bobby Womack – guitar
Larry Graham – bass, backing vocals
Greg Errico – drums
Gerry Gibson – drums
Little Sister – backing vocals

Production

Sly Stone – producer
Engineers
Chris Hinshaw
Jack Ashkinazy
James Conniff
James Greene
Robert Gratts
Willie Greer
Rich Tilles
Artwork (collage, cover design)
Lynn Ames
John Berg
Photography (reissue)
Debbie King
Don Hunstein
Fred Lombardi
Howard R. Cohen
Joey Franklin
Linda Tyler
Lynn Ames
Ray Gaspard
Steve Paley
Sylvester Stewart

Charts

Weekly charts

Year-end charts

Singles

See also
 List of Billboard 200 number-one albums of 1971
 List of Billboard 200 R&B number-one albums of 1972

References

Bibliography

External links
 There's a Riot Goin' On professional reviews at SuperSeventies.com
 Soul Survival: Music Reviews at The New Yorker
 Sly and the Family Stone - There's a Riot Goin' On (1971) album information and reviews on AllMusic

Sly and the Family Stone albums
1971 albums
Albums produced by Sly Stone
Epic Records albums
Avant-pop albums